The 2016–17 season was Futbol Club Barcelona's 117th in existence and the club's 86th consecutive season in the top flight of Spanish football. Barcelona was involved in four competitions after winning the double of La Liga and the Copa del Rey in the previous season. This would be the final season under head coach Luis Enrique as he decided to let his contract expire.

Barcelona kicked off the season with en emphatic 5–0 aggregate victory over Sevilla in the Supercopa de España, but the rest of the season was more mixed in nature. The most memorable highlights are certainly the historic 6–1 comeback win against Paris Saint-Germain in the return leg of the Champions League round of 16 to overturn the heavy 0–4 away defeat and the 3–2 last-minute away league victory in El Clásico over Real Madrid on April 23, courtesy of a Lionel Messi strike one of greatest UEFA Champions League comebacks of all time. However, these performances did not yield trophies in the aforementioned competitions, as Barça was shut down by Juventus in the Champions League quarter-finals (0–3 away, 0–0 home) and lost the league title to Real Madrid by three points. The only consolation was a third consecutive Copa del Rey win on May 27 against Alavés.

The season was the first without Dani Alves since 2007–08, who departed to Juventus, until he returned for his second and final spell in the 2021–22 season.

Kit

Season overview

June
On 1 June, the club announced that Sandro Ramírez's contract would be rescinded.

On 2 June, Barcelona announced that Dani Alves would be departing the club after eight seasons.

On 3 June, Barcelona announced that German club Borussia Dortmund have informed them of their desire to activate the buy-out clause for Marc Bartra.

On 5 June, the club announced that Denis Suárez will be forming part of the first team for this season.

July
On 1 July, Barcelona and Neymar negotiated a five-year contract extension lasting until 30 June 2021.

On 4 July, the club completed the transfer of Denis Suárez.

On 12 July, the club announced the transfers of 22-year-old French international defender Samuel Umtiti from Lyon and Lucas Digne from Paris Saint-Germain for the next five seasons, respectively.

On 14 July, the two transfers were completed.

On 19 July, Barcelona and Sergi Samper negotiated a three-year contract extension lasting until 30 June 2019, including promotion to the first team.

On 19 July, Barcelona and Munir El Haddadi also negotiated a three-year contract extension lasting until 30 June 2019.

On 19 July, Barcelona and Qatar Airways extended sponsorship agreement for one year more.

On 21 July, Barcelona and Valencia reached an agreement for the transfer of Portuguese international midfielder André Gomes. On 26 July, the transfer was completed.

During the press conference of Gomes' presentation, the club announced midfielder Javier Mascherano's contract was extended until 30 June 2019.

On 30 July, Barcelona won their first pre-season match against Scottish champions Celtic with a 1–3 score in Dublin as part of the 2016 International Champions Cup.

August
On 1 August, the club cancelled the contracts of Alex Song and Martín Montoya.

On 3 August, Barcelona defeated English Premier League champions Leicester City 4–2 in Stockholm with goals from Munir (2), Luis Suárez and Barcelona B player Rafa Mújica.

On 6 August, Barcelona were soundly defeated by Liverpool 4–0 at Wembley Stadium in London.

On 8 August, the club loaned Thomas Vermaelen to Italian club Roma with an option to buy.

On 10 August, the 2016 Joan Gamper Trophy was played against Italian club Sampdoria, finishing 3–2 with a goal from Luis Suárez and two from Lionel Messi.

On 14 August, Barcelona won the first official match in the 2016 Supercopa de España against Sevilla with a 0–2 away score.

On 18 August, Barcelona beat Sevilla with 3–0 (5–0 aggregate) and won their 12th Supercopa de España.

On 20 August, Barcelona defeated Real Betis 6–2 in their first Liga match, with a hat-trick from Luis Suárez, two goals from Messi and one from Arda Turan.

On 25 August, the club completed the transfer of 27-year-old goalkeeper Jasper Cillessen from Ajax on a five-year contract, with goalkeeper Claudio Bravo then joining Manchester City after two years with Barça. Several hours later, both teams were drawn into Group C of the Champions League draw, alongside Borussia Mönchengladbach and Celtic.

On 28 August, Barcelona defeated Athletic Bilbao 0–1 with a goal from Rakitić and Luis Enrique wins his 100th match as Barça manager, Ter Stegen made most goalkeeper passes in one single match in LaLiga.

On 30 August, the club completed the last transfer of Paco Alcácer from Valencia.

September
On 10 September, in the match against Deportivo Alavés, Barcelona suffered a 1–2 defeat.

On 13 September, Barcelona defeated Celtic 7–0 in the opening match of Group C in the Champions League. Messi notched his first hat-trick of the season, while Neymar provided four assists and a free-kick goal.

On 17 September, Barcelona faced for the first time recently promoted Leganés at the Estadio Municipal de Butarque. Barcelona won 1–5 with two goals from Messi and one each from Luis Suárez, Neymar and Rafinha.

On 21 September, Barcelona drew against Atlético Madrid 1–1; Ivan Rakitić gave Barça the lead before half-time, but Atlético battled back to draw level in the second half after Messi was substituted out due to injury.

On 24 September, Barcelona won 0–5 over Sporting de Gijón through two goals from Neymar and one each from Suárez, Turan and Rafinha.

On 28 September, Barcelona defeated Borussia Mönchengladbach 1–2 with goals from Turan and Gerard Piqué, turning around a 1–0 first-half deficit to Barça top of Group C.

October
On 2 October, Barcelona lost to Celta de Vigo 4–3; a second-half resurgence not enough for Luis Enrique's side as they finished on the wrong end of a seven-goal thriller away in Vigo.

On 15 October, Barcelona defeated Deportivo de La Coruña 4–0 with two goals from Rafinha and one each from Luis Suárez and Messi, the latter who returned from injury in the match.

On 19 October, Barcelona defeated Manchester City – led by former Barça manager Pep Guardiola – 4–0 at home on the strength of a Messi hat-trick.

On 22 October, Barcelona defeated Valencia 2–3 at Mestalla, Messi spot-kick in injury time secured three points out of an electrifying encounter.

On 29 October, Barcelona won against Granada 1–0 in the 1,500th game at Camp Nou, Barça found it tough to breakdown the stubborn visitors but Rafinha's strike was enough to claim the win.

November
On 1 November, Barcelona was defeated by Manchester City 3–1 at Manchester, Guardiola's team came from behind after Messi opened scoring.

On 6 November, Barcelona won 1–2 against Sevilla at the Sánchez Pizjuán; Messi canceled out Vitolo's opener late in the first half before setting up Luis Suárez for the winner in a frenetic game.

On 16 November, the club announced Rakuten signed up as FC Barcelona's new main global partner; the Japanese company will appear on the front of the team's shirt and become the Global Innovation and Entertainment Partner for the next four seasons, starting 1 July 2017.

On 19 November, Barça drew Málaga 0–0, a domineering performance was frustrated by 90 minutes of intense Andalusian defending.

On 23 November, Barcelona won 2–0 against Celtic at Celtic Park; coupled with Man City's draw in Germany, they clinched a seeded berth in the round of sixteen. Also in this game Messi reached 100 goals in international competitions for Barcelona.

On 27 November, Barcelona drew 1–1 with Real Sociedad at Anoeta, Messi's second-half leveller halted Barça's run of four straight league losses in San Sebastian.

On 30 November, Barcelona drew Hércules 1–1, a fine long range strike from debutant Aleña gave Barça a slight advantage going into the second leg.

December

On 3 December, Barcelona drew 1–1 with Real Madrid, Luis Suárez' header being cancelled out by 90th minute Ramos equaliser.

On 6 December, Barcelona won 4–0 against Borussia Mönchengladbach, a game which saw a hat-trick from Arda Turan.

On 10 December, Barcelona won Osasuna 0–3, Luis Suárez breaks the deadlock in the second half, and two further goals from Leo Messi go on to claim all three points in Pamplona.

On 12 December, Barcelona were drawn against Paris Saint-Germain in the round of 16 of the Champions League.

On 15 December, Barcelona and Suárez negotiated a five-year contract extension lasting until 30 June 2021.

On 18 December, Barcelona won 4–1 against Espanyol in the Derbi barceloní.

On 21 December, Barcelona won 7–0 against Hércules; Paco Alcácer scored his first official goal and Arda Turan got a hat-trick as Barça cruised into the last 16 of the Copa del Rey.

On 23 December, Barcelona was drawn against Athletic Club in the round of 16 of the Copa del Rey.

January
On 8 January Barcelona drew 1–1 with Villarreal, with Messi scoring the equalizer in the 90th minute.

On 11 January, Barcelona won 3–1 against Athletic Bilbao, goals from Suárez, Neymar and Messi secured an action-packed victory that kept alive the quest for a third consecutive Copa del Rey trophy.

On 14 January, Barcelona won 5–0 against Las Palmas, a brace from Luis Suárez and one each for Leo Messi, Arda Turan and Aleix Vidal gave Barça a winning home start to the league in 2017.

On 19 January Barcelona won 0–1 against Real Sociedad, Neymar's 21st-minute penalty ended decade of disappointments in San Sebastián.

On 22 January, Barcelona won 0–4 against Eibar, a first-half strike from Denis followed by a goal each from the trident in the second secured another three points to stay within reach of the top two.

On 26 January, Barcelona won 5–2 against Real Sociedad, a brace from Denis Suárez and further goals by Leo Messi, Luis Suárez and Arda Turan sent Barça into the final four of the Copa del Rey.

On 29 January Barcelona drew 1–1 with Real Betis, an incident-packed game saw Suárez snatched a draw in the 90th minute after the Catalans had already seen at least one valid equaliser overruled.

February
On 1 February, Barcelona won 2–1 against Atlético Madrid, Suárez and Messi put them in command but Griezmann's second half header kept Atlético alive.

On 4 February, Barcelona won 3–0 against Athletic Club Bilbao, Paco Alcácer, Leo Messi, and Aleix Vidal all found the net.

On 7 February, Barcelona draw 1–1 against Atlético Madrid, Luis Suárez's tap-in just before half-time was enough to see the Catalans into a fourth consecutive Copa del Rey final despite late drama which saw the visitors equalise and a player sent off.

On 11 February, Barcelona won 6–0 against Alavés. Luis Suárez (2), Neymar Jr, Leo Messi and Ivan Rakitic were on target, plus one own goal; Aleix Vidal suffered a very serious ankle injury late in the game.

On 14 February, Barcelona lost 4–0 against Paris Saint-Germain in the first leg of the first knockout round of the Champions League.

On 19 February, Barcelona won 2–1 against Leganés, Leo Messi's 90th-minute penalty won the game at the Camp Nou.

On 26 February, Barcelona won 2–1 against Atlético Madrid, Rafinha's opener was quickly cancelled out by Godín's header but Messi sealed three points in the closing stages.

March
On 1 March, Barcelona won 6–1 against Sporting Gijón, with goals from Messi, Suárez, Alcácer, Neymar Jr, Rakitić and an own goal at the Camp Nou. During the press conference after the match, Luis Enrique announced his decision to leave at the end of the season.

On 4 March, Barcelona won 5–0 against Celta, with goals from Messi (2), Neymar, Rakitic and Umtiti.

On 8 March, Barça came back from a 4–0 deficit in the first leg. In the second leg, they were up 3–1, but by way of scoring three goals in the last seven minutes, they advanced. Marc-Andre Ter Stegen's saves coupled with Neymar's brace and Sergi Roberto's goal at the death clinched the 6-5 aggregate win.

On 9 March, Barcelona and Rakitic negotiated a four-year contract extension lasting until 30 June 2021.

On 12 March, Barcelona lost to Deportivo la Coruña 2–1, two goals from corners condemned Barça to defeat in Galicia, with Luis Suárez scoring in between.

On 17 March, Barcelona were drawn against Juventus in the quarter finals of the Champions League.

On 19 March, Barcelona won 4–2 against Valencia, with goals from Suárez, André Gomes and a brace from Messi.

April
Barcelona defeated Granada on 2 April 1–4 away, goals from Suárez, Alcácer, Rakitic and Neymar handed Barça another three points to keep in close proximity of the top.

On 5 April, Barcelona defeated Sevilla 3–0, with a goal from Suárez and two from Messi in 8 minutes.

On 8 April, Barcelona lost to Málaga 2–0, ten-man Barça missed out on the chance to return to the top of the table.

On 11 April, Barcelona lost to Juventus 3–0, Barça could not break through Juve's rock-solid defense.

On 15 April, Barcelona beat Real Sociedad 3–2, Barça edged past La Real in a hard-fought duel thanked to two goals from Leo Messi and one from Paco Alcácer.

On 19 April, Barcelona drew 0–0 with Juventus, Barça bade farewell to the Champions League after being unable to break down a resilient Juve backline.

On 23 April, Barcelona beat Real Madrid 3–2, Barça grabbed a dramatic victory at the Santiago Bernabéu thanks to an injury-time strike from Leo Messi to move joint-top of the table. The Argentine star scored his 500th official goal in blaugrana colours at the same time.

On 26 April, Barcelona beat Osasuna 7–1, braces for Gomes, Messi and Alcácer, and a first ever Barça goal for Mascherano, earned the points.

On 29 April, Barcelona beat Espanyol 3–0, all goals after half time, including a Suárez brace and one from Rakitic, to stay top of the table.

May
On 6 May, Barcelona beat Villarreal 4–1, Messi, Suarez and Neymar all scored to keep the Liga title challenge alive, in the process surpassing a combined 100 goals for a third consecutive season.

On 14 May, Barcelona beat Las Palmas 4–1, Neymar Jr scored three of the four goals that meant the championship race would now go to the last weekend.

On 21 May, Barcelona won Eibar 4–2, Luis Enrique's men rally back from two goals down to claim victory on the final day of the league campaign but it was not enough to earn the title.

On 27 May, Barcelona won Alavés 3–1, Barça become the first side since the 1950s to win the Copa del Rey three years in a row, on Luis Enrique's last game in charge.

On 29 May, Barcelona and Ter Stegen negotiated a five-year contract extension lasting until 30 June 2022.

Players

Squad information

From youth squad

Players in

Total spending: €122.75M

Players out

Total income: €31.6 million

Net:  €91.15 million

Technical staff

Statistics

Squad appearances and goals
Last updated on 27 May 2017.

|-
! colspan=14 style=background:#dcdcdc; text-align:center|Goalkeepers

|-
! colspan=14 style=background:#dcdcdc; text-align:center|Defenders

|-
! colspan=14 style=background:#dcdcdc; text-align:center|Midfielders

|-
! colspan=14 style=background:#dcdcdc; text-align:center|Forwards

|-
! colspan=14 style=background:#dcdcdc; text-align:center| Players who have made an appearance or had a squad number this season but have left the club

|-
|}

Squad statistics
{|class="wikitable" style="text-align: center;"
|-
!
! style="width:70px;"|League
! style="width:70px;"|Europe
! style="width:70px;"|Cup
! style="width:70px;"|Others
! style="width:70px;"|Total Stats
|-
|align=left|Games played       || 38 || 10 || 9 || 2 || 59
|-
|align=left|Games won          || 28 || 6 || 6 || 2 || 42
|-
|align=left|Games drawn        || 6 || 1 || 2 || 0 || 9
|-
|align=left|Games lost         || 4 || 3 || 1 || 0 || 8
|-
|align=left|Goals scored       || 116 || 26 || 24 || 5 || 171
|-
|align=left|Goals conceded     || 37 || 12 || 9 || 0 || 58
|-
|align=left|Goal difference    || 79 || 14 || 15 || 5 || 113
|-
|align=left|Clean sheets       || 12 || 4 || 2 || 2 || 19
|-
|align=left|Goal by Substitute || 2 || 2 || 1 || 1 || 5
|-
|align=left|Total shots        || – || – || – || –|| –
|-
|align=left|Shots on target    || – || – || – || –|| –
|-
|align=left|Corners            || – || – || – || –|| –
|-
|align=left|Players used       || – || – || – || –|| –
|-
|align=left|Offsides           || – || – || – || –|| –
|-
|align=left|Fouls suffered     || – || – || – || –|| –
|-
|align=left|Fouls committed    || – || – || – || –|| –
|-
|align=left|Yellow cards       || 65 || 20 || 17 || 3 || 105
|-
|align=left|Red cards          || 1 || 1 || 2 || 0 || 4
|-

Players Used: Barcelona has used a total of – different players in all competitions.

Goalscorers

Last updated: 27 May 2017

Hat-tricks

(H) – Home; (A) – Away

Clean sheets
Updated 14 January 2017.

Disciplinary record

Includes all competitive matches. Players listed below made at least one appearance for Barcelona first squad during the season.

Injury record

Pre-season and friendlies

International Champions Cup

Joan Gamper Trophy

Supercopa de Catalunya

Qatar Airways Cup

Competitions

Overview

La Liga

League table

Results summary

Results by round

Matches

Copa del Rey

Round of 32

Round of 16

Quarter-finals

Semi-finals

Final

Supercopa de España

UEFA Champions League

Group stage

Knockout phase

Round of 16

Quarter-finals

References

External links

FC Barcelona seasons
2016–17 La Liga
Barcelona
Barcelona
Barcelona